K'allapayuq (Quechua k'allapa stretcher, -yuq a suffix to indicate ownership, "the one with a stretcher", Hispanicized spelling Callapayoc) is a mountain in the Chunta mountain range in the Andes of Peru, about  high. It is located in the Huancavelica Region, Huancavelica Province, Huacocolpa District. K'allapayuq lies northeast of Ch'aqra Punta and southeast of Puka Punta.

References

Mountains of Huancavelica Region
Mountains of Peru